André Peder Boman (born 15 November 2001) is a Swedish football midfielder who plays for Varberg.

Career 
On 7 December 2022, Boman was included in Sweden's squad for their January tour of 2023 in Portugal, with matches scheduled against Finland and Iceland. He made his full international debut for Sweden on 9 January 2023, playing for 90 minutes in a friendly 2–0 win against Finland.

Career statistics

International

References

2001 births
Living people
Swedish footballers
Sweden international footballers
Association football midfielders
Varbergs BoIS players
Superettan players
Allsvenskan players